Trajal Harrell (born 1973) is an American dancer and choreographer. Best known for a series entitled Twenty Looks or Paris is Burning at The Judson Church, Harrell "confronts the history, construction, and interpretation of contemporary dance."

Career 
Harrell's work has been presented at festivals in Paris, Vienna, Berlin, Rio De Janeiro, Montreal, and the Netherlands, and at venues including The Kitchen, New York Live Arts, the Walker Art Center, Danspace Project, Dance Theater Workshop, Performance Space 122, Philadelphia Live Arts, REDCAT, Cornell University, Colorado College, and the Institute of Contemporary Art, Boston. He has shown performance work in visual art contexts at The Museum of Modern Art, the New Museum, MoMA PS1, Fondation Cartier pour L’art Contemporain, the Bronx Museum of the Arts; Fundação Serralves, Centre Pompidou-Metz, and Art Basel.

Harrell has received fellowships from organizations including the Foundation for Contemporary Arts Grants to Artists award (2014), the John Simon Guggenheim Memorial Foundation, The Saison Foundation, the Art Matters Foundation, and the Doris Duke Foundation.

Twenty Looks or Paris is Burning at The Judson Church 
Harrell's work, Twenty Looks or Paris is Burning at The Judson Church asks the question, "What would have happened in 1963 if someone from the vogueing ball scene in Harlem had come downtown to perform alongside the early postmoderns at Judson Church?" Harrell takes up dance history by combining these two specific and separated groups of dance makers (separated by class, race, gender, and other categories of "identity").

The project began in 2009 and completed in 2017, staged in different sizes over the years.

Twenty Looks or Paris is Burning at The Judson Church has been theorized by scholars Madison Moore as well as Tavia Nyong'o, in his 2018 work Afro-Fabulations: The Queer Drama of Black Life.

References

External links
Official website 

1973 births
Living people
American male dancers
American choreographers
Yale University alumni